"Numb" is a song by English trip hop group Portishead, released on 13 June 1994 as the lead single from their debut album, Dummy (1994). NME magazine ranked it at number 43 on their list of the "Best Albums and Tracks of 1994".

Release
The single was released on 13 June 1994 in the United Kingdom and on 17 October 1994 in Australia. It did not chart in Europe, reaching the top 300 only in Australia at number 213.

Critical reception
Pan-European magazine Music & Media wrote, "Not to be confused with U2's number, although they share the love for cinema. Will their short film To Kill a Dead Man bear as much suspense as this song in a Fever spirit?" Andy Beevers from Music Weeks RM Dance Update declared it as "a gem of a debut with its moody spaced-out beats and haunting melancholy female vocal." Jonathan Bernstein from Spin described it as "creepy" track.

Track listings
All tracks are remixes of "Numb" except "A Tribute to Monk & Canatella", which is a seven-minute instrumental track followed by 14 seconds of silence and yet another remix of "Numb".

 UK CD and 12-inch single, Australian CD single "Numb" – 3:57
 "Numb (Numbed in Moscow)" – 3:56
 "Numb (Revenge of the Number)" – 3:23
 "Numb" (Earth - Linger) – 4:14
 "A Tribute to Monk & Canatella" – 11:01

 European CD single'
 "Numb" – 3:55
 "Sour Times" (live) – 5:52
 "Wandering Star" (live) – 4:48
 "Interlude" (live) – 2:26

Charts

References

1994 debut singles
1994 songs
Go! Discs singles
Portishead (band) songs
Songs written by Adrian Utley
Songs written by Beth Gibbons
Songs written by Geoff Barrow